Weiskirchen is a municipality in the district Merzig-Wadern, in Saarland, Germany. It is situated in the Hunsrück, approx. 20 km northeast of Merzig, and 25 km southeast of Trier.

Geography

Districts 

 Konfeld
 Rappweiler-Zwalbach 
 Thailen
 Weierweiler
 Weiskirchen

Sights 
In Rappweiler is the "Wild and hiking park Weiskirchen-Rappweiler", whose stock consists mainly of red deer. In the park is also the information center of the Saar-Hunsrück Nature Park with a permanent exhibition.

References

Merzig-Wadern